Pare & Pare is a 2012 Philippine television comedy musical talk show broadcast by GMA Network. Hosted by Ogie Alcasid and Michael V., it premiered on May 20, 2012. The show concluded on August 12, 2012 with a total of 12 episodes.

Segments

The Week in Review
Barako Tips
Sabi-Sabi Po
Bet Mo, Bet Ko
Masa Poll

Ratings
According to AGB Nielsen Philippines' Mega Manila household television ratings, the pilot episode of Pare & Pare earned a 20.3% rating. While the final episode scored a 10.8% rating.

Accolades

References

2012 Philippine television series debuts
2012 Philippine television series endings
Filipino-language television shows
GMA Network original programming
Philippine television talk shows